Leigh McConnon (born 9 June 1953) is a former Australian rules footballer who played for Carlton and Fitzroy in the Victorian Football League (VFL).
 
A professional sprint racer before coming to Carlton, McConnon had also been a good player at North Hobart and was a member of their 1974 premiership team. McConnon represented Tasmania in the 1975 Knockout Carnival. 

He made a Preliminary Final in his first season with Carlton but McConnon, a wingman, lost his place in the side the following season and returned to Tasmania. Fitzroy lured him back to league football in 1980 and he played a further two seasons. In 1992, McConnon was appointed senior coach of Clarence.

References

Holmesby, Russell and Main, Jim (2007). The Encyclopedia of AFL Footballers. 7th ed. Melbourne: Bas Publishing.

1953 births
Living people
Carlton Football Club players
Fitzroy Football Club players
North Hobart Football Club players
Clarence Football Club coaches
Australian rules footballers from Tasmania
Tasmanian Football Hall of Fame inductees
Glenorchy Football Club coaches